This is a timeline of feminism in the United States. It contains feminist and antifeminist events. It should contain events within the ideologies and philosophies of feminism and antifeminism. It should, however, not contain material about changes in women's legal rights: for that, see Timeline of women's legal rights in the United States (other than voting), or, if it concerns the right to vote, to Timeline of women's suffrage in the United States.

Timeline of feminism in the United States

19th and early 20th century
First-wave feminism was a period of feminist activity and thought, that occurred within the time period of the 19th and early 20th century throughout the world. It focused on legal issues, primarily on gaining women's suffrage (the right to vote).

1960s
 1963: The Feminine Mystique was published; it is a book written by Betty Friedan which is widely credited with starting the beginning of second-wave feminism in the United States. Second-wave feminism was a period of feminist activity and thought that first began in the early 1960s in the United States, and eventually spread throughout the Western world and beyond. In the United States the movement lasted through the early 1980s.
 Black feminism became popular in the 1960s, in response to the sexism of the civil rights movement and racism of the feminist movement. 
 Fat feminism originated in the late 1960s. Fat feminism, often associated with "body-positivity", is a social movement that incorporates feminist themes of equality, social justice, and cultural analysis based on the weight of a woman or a non-binary feminine person.
 1969: Chicana feminism, also called Xicanisma, is a sociopolitical movement in the United States that analyzes the historical, cultural, spiritual, educational, and economic intersections of Mexican-American women that identify as Chicana. Chicana feminism challenges the stereotypes that Chicanas face across lines of gender, ethnicity, race, class, and sexuality. Most importantly, Chicana feminism serves as a movement that helps women to reclaim their existence between the Chicano and American feminist movements. The 1969 Chicano Youth Liberation Conference began the Chicano movement and eventually, MEChA. At the conference, women began to get involved in the male-dominated dialogue to address feminist concerns. After the conference, women returned to their communities as activists and thus began the Chicana feminist movement.

1970s
The term materialist feminism emerged in the late 1970s; materialist feminism highlights capitalism and patriarchy as central in understanding women's oppression. Under materialist feminism, gender is seen as a social construct, and society forces gender roles, such as bearing children, onto women. Materialist feminism's ideal vision is a society in which women are treated socially and economically the same as men. The theory centers on social change rather than seeking transformation within the capitalist system.

1980s
 Difference feminism was developed by feminists in the 1980s, in part as a reaction to popular liberal feminism (also known as "equality feminism"), which emphasizes the similarities between women and men in order to argue for equal treatment for women. Difference feminism, although it is still aimed at equality between men and women, emphasizes the differences between men and women and argues that identicality or sameness are necessary in order for men and women, and masculine and feminine values, to be treated equally. Liberal feminism aims to make society and law gender-neutral, since it sees recognition of gender difference as a barrier to rights and participation within liberal democracy, while difference feminism holds that gender-neutrality harms women "whether by impelling them to imitate men, by depriving society of their distinctive contributions, or by letting them participate in society only on terms that favor men".
 Equity feminism (also stylized equity-feminism) is a form of liberal feminism discussed since the 1980s, specifically a kind of classical liberal feminism and libertarian feminism.

1990s
Third-wave feminism is associated with the emergence of riot grrrl, the feminist punk subculture, in the early 1990s in Olympia, Washington. In 1991 Anita Hill testified in Washington, D.C., to an all-male, all-white Senate Judiciary Committee that Clarence Thomas, nominated for the Supreme Court of the United States, had sexually harassed her. Rebecca Walker responded to Thomas's appointment with an article in Ms. Magazine, "Becoming the Third Wave" (1992), which coined the term third wave: "Do not vote for them unless they work for us. Do not have sex with them, do not break bread with them, do not nurture them if they don't prioritize our freedom to control our bodies and our lives. I am not a post-feminism feminist. I am the Third Wave." The third wave focused on abolishing gender-role stereotypes and expanding feminism to include women of all races, classes and cultures.

2010s
Fourth-wave feminism began around 2012 and is characterized by a focus on the empowerment of women and the use of internet tools, and is centered on intersectionality.

See also
Timeline of feminism

References

Feminism in the United States
Feminism in the United States
Feminism in the United States
Feminism in the United States
History of women in the United States